iNews TV may refer to:
 iNews, an Indonesian television network
 i-News, an Indian late night news program